The McKnight Foundation, a Minnesota-based family foundation, advances a more just, creative, and abundant future where people and planet thrive. Established in 1953, the McKnight Foundation is deeply committed to advancing climate solutions in the Midwest; building an equitable and inclusive Minnesota; and supporting the arts and culture in Minnesota, neuroscience, and international crop research.

Finances 
The McKnight Foundation was founded in 1953 by William L. McKnight, an early leader of the 3M Corporation, and Maude L. McKnight, and was independently endowed by the McKnight's. Bolstered by their estates, the foundation's assets grew substantially in the 1980s. In 2021, the foundation assets were approximately $3 billion.

Impact Investing

The McKnight Foundation committed to achieving net zero greenhouse gas emissions across its $3 billion endowment by 2050 at the latest. In 2014, the McKnight Foundation committed to investing $200 million (10 percent of its $2 billion endowment) in strategies that align with McKnight’s mission. These investments generate financial return, meet their fiduciary duty, and drive program learning, all while advancing McKnight's mission. They aim to generate a triple bottom line.

References

External links
McKnight Foundation

Foundations based in the United States
Non-profit organizations based in Minnesota
Organizations based in Minneapolis
1953 establishments in Minnesota